Zindagi Shatranj Hai is an Hindi film directed by Dushyant Pratap Singh. starring Hiten Tejwani, Shawar Ali, Pankaj Berry, Ashutosh Kaushik, Daler Mehndi Bruna Abdullah and Zaidh Shaikh.

Synopsis
The story of Zindagi Ek Shatranj is full of suspense and surprising twists and turns. A woman finds herself in dire straits when a man claims to be her husband. Meanwhile, serial murders are taking place in the city.

Cast
 Hiten Tejwani 
 Shawar Ali
 Pankaj Berry
 Daler Mehndi 
 Bruna Abdullah 
 Hemant Pandey 
 Zaidh Shaikh 
 Ashutosh Kaushik
 Ekta Jain  
 Rajkumar Kanojiya

References

External links
 

2023 drama films
2023 films
Upcoming Hindi-language films
Upcoming Indian films